Rakitovo Municipality is a municipality in the Pazardzhik Province of Bulgaria. The municipality consists of three settlements: two towns and one village.

Demography

At the 2011 census, the population of Rakitovo was 15,064. Most of the inhabitants (54.66%) were Bulgarians, and there was a significant minority of Gypsies/Romani (15.75%). 28.96% of the population's ethnicity was unknown.

Communities

Towns
 Rakitovo
 Kostandovo

Villages
 Dorkovo

References

Municipalities in Pazardzhik Province